"Love Me Tender" is a 1956 ballad song recorded by Elvis Presley and published by "Elvis Presley Music" from the 20th Century Fox film of the same name. Lyrics are credited to "Vera Matson" (though the actual lyricist was her husband, Ken Darby) and Elvis Presley himself. The melody is identical to the sentimental Civil War ballad "Aura Lea" and therefore credited to Aura Lea's composer, the Englishman George R. Poulton. The RCA Victor recording by Elvis Presley was No. 1 on both the Billboard and Cashbox charts in 1956. 

The song is also featured in many other films and television shows, including FM, Touched By Love, This is Elvis, Porky's Revenge, Wild at Heart, Die Hard 2, Honeymoon in Vegas, Backbeat, Gaudi Afternoon, Machine Gun Molly, The Princess Diaries 2: Royal Engagement, William Eggleston in the Real World, California Dreamin', Love in Space, Masters of Sex, Devil's Due, Just Before I Go, 90 Minutes in Heaven, and Ready or Not.

History 
The 1956 song "Love Me Tender" puts new words to a new musical adaptation of the Civil War song "Aura Lee," published in 1861. "Aura Lee" had music by George R. Poulton and words by W. W. Fosdick. It later became popular with college glee clubs and barbershop quartets. It was also sung at the U.S. Military Academy at West Point, New York.

The principal writer of the lyrics was Ken Darby, who also adapted Poulton's Civil War tune, which was in the public domain. The song was published by Elvis Presley Music. and credited to Presley and Darby's wife Vera Matson. Presley received co-songwriting credit due to his Hill & Range publishing deal which demanded songwriters concede 50 percent of the credit of their song if they wanted Presley to record it; Presley had songwriting input on only a very small number of the many songs he recorded.  Darby was often asked about his decision to credit the song to his wife along with Presley, and his standard response was an acid, "because she didn't write it either".

As with nearly all his early RCA recordings, Presley took control in the studio despite not being credited as producer. He would regularly change arrangements and lyrics to the point that the original song was barely recognizable. Ken Darby described Elvis Presley's role in the creation of the song:
He adjusted the music and the lyrics to his own particular presentation. Elvis has the most terrific ear of anyone I have ever met. He does not read music, but he does not need to. All I had to do was play the song for him once, and he made it his own! He has perfect judgment of what is right for him. He exercised that judgment when he chose 'Love Me Tender' as his theme song.
Elvis Presley performed "Love Me Tender" on The Ed Sullivan Show on September 9, 1956, shortly before the single's release and about a month before the movie, Love Me Tender, was released (for which the reworded song had been written). After that, RCA received more than a million advance orders, making it a gold record before it was even released. The studio, 20th Century Fox, originally wanted to call the movie The Reno Brothers, but instead re-titled it Love Me Tender to capitalize on the song's popularity.

Movie producer David Weisbart would not allow Presley's regular band (Scotty Moore, Bill Black, and D.J. Fontana) to play on the soundtrack. Instead, The Ken Darby Trio provided the musical backing with Red Robinson on drums, Charles Prescott on bass, Vita Mumolo on guitar, and Jon Dodson on background vocals, with Presley providing only lead vocals.

Elvis Presley recording
The single debuted at #2 on the "Best Sellers in Stores" pop singles chart, the first time a single made its first appearance at the #2 position.

The song hit #1 on the Billboard charts the week ending November 3, 1956, remaining in the position for 5 weeks and reached no. 11 on the charts in the UK. "Love Me Tender" also reached number three for three weeks on the R&B chart.

This version was ranked #437 on Rolling Stone's list of the 500 Greatest Songs of All Time.

In 1968, Presley recorded a 52-second track entitled "Violet (Flower of N.Y.U.)" for the soundtrack of the film The Trouble with Girls. Unreleased until after Presley's death, the song was Presley's second adaptation of "Aura Lee".

Although Presley never re-recorded "Love Me Tender" in a studio setting, two live recordings of the song were released on the albums: NBC-TV Special and Elvis: As Recorded at Madison Square Garden, with additional performances from concert and television appearances being released after Presley's death. The song was also performed in the Golden Globe-winning concert film Elvis on Tour (1972). As seen in that film, and in other filmed and recorded accounts, Presley generally performed only a portion of the song's lyrics live, instead usually using the song as a device to interact with (usually) female members of the audience.

"Love Me Tender" was also included in the four song extended play (EP) album Love Me Tender of the songs from the film. The reprise of the song was not included on the EP.

Versions
 Love Me Tender - 2:41 - Recorded Aug 24, 1956
 Love Me Tender (End title version) - 1:08 - Recorded Oct 01, 1956
 Love Me Tender (Stereo version) - 2:42 - Recorded Aug 24, 1956

The 1997 compact disc reissue with bonus tracks of the Jailhouse Rock EP contains these three versions.

Other recordings

 Richard Chamberlain reached no. 21 on the Billboard Pop singles chart with his version when it was released as a single in 1962 on MGM, no. 15 in the UK, and no. 31 in Canada.
 Percy Sledge had a Top 40 hit with a cover version in 1967, going to no. 40 on the US Billboard Pop chart, no. 35 on the R&B chart, and no. 35 on the Canadian chart.
 B.B. King recorded the song on his 1982 MCA album Love Me Tender.
 Albert King on his 1970 album King, Does the King's Things.
 Nat King Cole performed it on his 1950s TV show.
 Brian Hyland on his 1961 album Let Me Belong to You.
 Cliff Richard performed it on TV as part of the Danish 2000 Contest and recorded it on his Wanted album.
 Chuck Jackson on his 1966 Wand album Dedicated to the King!! 
 Johnny Hallyday recorded a French version of it in 1967, titled "Amour d'été".
 Julie Andrews and Johnny Cash recorded the song in 1982.
 Connie Francis recorded the song for the 1961 movie-song album Connie Francis sings "Never on Sunday"; she also recorded the original Aura Lee for the album Connie Francis sings Folk Song Favorites of the same year.
 Della Reese recorded the song in 1983 for the album Sure Like Lovin' You.
 Johnny Nash on the 1970 album Folk Soul and as a 1969 45 A side single on Major Minor.
 Marty Robbins in 1970.
 The Lawrence Welk Show, twice in 1957, with Lawrence Welk playing organ and with The Lennon Sisters on vocals.
 Bert Kaempfert on the 1973 LP album Fabulous Fifties, MCA-3.
 Nana Mouskouri on her 1986 album Why Worry.
 Muslim Magomaev recorded it in 2007.
 Ricky Nelson performed the song on an episode of the TV series The Adventures of Ozzie and Harriet.
 The Platters released the song in 1965 as a Mercury Records 45 single.
 Gene Summers included the song on his 2008 album Reminisce Cafe.
 B.J. Thomas released the song in 1980 on the compilation album Best of B.J. Thomas.
 Freddy Fender recorded the song on the LP Love Me Tender, Crazy Cajun 1011.
 Barry Manilow in 2010 on the album The Greatest Love Songs of All-Time.
 Linda Ronstadt recorded the song in 1978 on the Living in the USA album.
 Engelbert Humperdinck released the song in 2000 on his #1 Love Songs of All-Time album.
 Norah Jones and Adam Levy recorded a version of it for The Princess Diaries 2: Royal Engagement (soundtrack)
 James Brown released his version as an A side single in 1978, b/w "Have A Happy Day", Polydor 14460, and as a B side b/w "The Spank" as Polydor 14487, as a tribute.
 Tony Bennett recorded a version on the 1994 Mercury album It's Now or Never: The Tribute to Elvis Presley.
 Frank Sinatra performed the song in 1960 as a duet with Elvis Presley for a television special (in a medley with Presley singing Sinatra's hit, "Witchcraft"), and later recorded it for his Trilogy collection in 1980.
 Guitarist Duane Eddy recorded the song in 1962.
 Willie Nelson recorded the song in 1985, for the Porky's Revenge soundtrack.
 Johnny Mathis recorded the song in 2010 on his Let It Be Me album.
 Cerys Matthews performed the song for BBC Radio 2, the cover was released in 2010 as part of the album Dermot O'Leary Presents The Saturday Sessions.
 Pat Boone released the song in 1963 on his album Pat Boone Sings Guess Who? 
 Thalía recorded the song in 2010 on the album "Viva Elvis".
 Mick Ronson covered the song on his 1974 album Slaughter on 10th Avenue.
 Vytautas Juozapaitis, a soloist of Lithuanian National Opera and Ballet Theatre, recorded a Lithuanian version entitled "Mylek Mane Svelniai" on his debut album Negaliu Nemyleti (Can't Help Falling In Love) released in 2004.
 Annette Peacock covered the song on her 1972 album I'm the One.
 Scatman John covered the song before his death in December 1999 in his greatest hits compilation, The Best of Scatman John, which was released on October 7, 2002 (Japan only).
 Deana Martin recorded “Love Me Tender” in 2009. The song was released on her album, Volare.
 Katie Waissel recorded a version, which has been leaked to the internet.
 Mina recorded and released the song on her album 12 (American Song Book) in 2012. (A previous and different version was recorded and released on her 1991 album Caterpillar.)
 Jim Morrison recorded a version in his "Rock is Dead" sessions.
 Andrea Bocelli recorded the song on his 2013 album Passione.
 Petula Clark recorded the song on her 2013 album Lost In You.
 Barbra Streisand recorded the song as a duet with Presley, for her 2014 album Partners. Due to Presley's death in 1977, Streisand had to sample the original 1956 Presley recording for the album. Coincidentally, Presley's label RCA Records became a sister label to Streisand's Columbia Records, first in 2004 when BMG merged with Sony Music, and again in 2008 when Sony officially absorbed BMG. Both recordings are now in the Sony Archives.
Jessica Simpson's version appeared in the Lilo & Stitch: Island Favorites compilation album.
Nicolas Cage performed a version for the film over the credits of Wild at Heart, as his character Sailor is a big Elvis fan.
Amy Grant recorded the song for the 1992 film Honeymoon in Vegas and its soundtrack album and can also be heard during General Hospital.
Demis Roussos covered the song on his 1984 album Reflections. His cover was also released as a single (in the same year).

Charts

Weekly charts

Year-end charts

Certifications

References

External links
 Love Me Tender recording sessions, Hollywood, 1956, part 1.
 Love Me Tender recording sessions, Hollywood, 1956, part 2.
 Love Me Tender / Anyway You Want Me Guide part of The Elvis Presley Record Research Database
 The Truth Behind Love Me Tender 

1950s ballads
Elvis Presley songs
Richard Chamberlain songs
The Lettermen songs
Merle Haggard songs
Norah Jones songs
Scatman John songs
Gene Summers songs
Linda Ronstadt songs
Amy Grant songs
Willie Nelson songs
Kenny Rogers songs
Tony Bennett songs
Frank Sinatra songs
Mental As Anything songs
Number-one singles in Canada
Number-one singles in the United States
Billboard Top 100 number-one singles
1956 singles
1962 singles
1956 songs
RCA Records singles
RCA Victor singles
MGM Records singles
Folk ballads